"Land of the Living" is a song by American singer Kristine W. It was released in 1996 as the third and final single from her debut album, Land of the Living (1996). The single was a huge club hit but only reached number 57 on the UK Singles Chart. In the US, it spent two weeks at number-one on the Billboard Hot Dance Club Play chart in November 1996. That was the singer's third number-one single on this survey.

American singer and actress Patti LaBelle and Kristine W covered the song as a duet on Labelle's 2005 cover album Classic Moments.

Critical reception
Larry Flick from Billboard wrote that Kristine W returns with the title track to her deservedly acclaimed debut, "a melancholy pop/house anthem that beautifully showcases her formidable pipes and dramatic flair. With its affecting and intelligent lyrics, "Land Of The Living" deftly squashes the idea that all dance music is fluffy and mindless." William Stevensen from Entertainment Weekly described it as "ebullient". Alan Jones from Music Week declared it a "dancefloor monster". Joey Bolsadura from Muzik viewed it as a "song of survival a la Gloria Gaynor with phunk". A reviewer from People Magazine said that "even when Kristine W strikes her gloomiest pose, as in the beginning of the title song—"I got a mirror, a bottle and a pen/ The mirror is cracked/ The bottle is empty/ And my pen don't know where to begin"—she conveys that somehow things will get better. They do. Before long, a jacked-up beat kicks in, and she rides it all the way to a happy ending." J.D. Considine for Vibe complimented it as a "lean, house-style jam".

Official versions

 Album Version 4:59
 Radio Edit 3:59
 Rollo & Sister Bliss/Kristine W Radio Edit 4:00
 Rollo And Sister Bliss Remix 7:18
 Lisa Marie Experience Radio Edit 4:08
 Lisa Marie Experience 8:05
 Lisa Marie Sequential Dub 7:41
 Junior Vasquez New Vocal Mix 7:36
 Junior's Factory Dub 8:01
 Dekkard's Planet Vocal Mix 12:03
 Dekkard's Planet Dub Mix 12:03
 Deep Dish Land Of The Lost Vocal Edit 8:30

 Deep Dish Land Of The Lost Remix (Vocal) 13:07
 Deep Dish Land Of The Lost Remix (Instrumental) 13:07
 Deep Dish Summer Madness Dub 11:30
 Deep Dish Slee-Stack Dub 1 5:20
 Deep Dish Slee-Stack Dub 2 3:40
 Kevin Saunderson Remix 6:35
 Kevin Saunderson Dub 6:33
 Timothy Allan Remix 7:26
 Timothy Allan Dub 7:26
 Maddladd's Dub 6:51
 Subgroover Radio Edit 3:44
 Subgroover Subwoofer Club Mix 5:28

Charts

Weekly charts

Year-end charts

See also
List of number-one dance hits (United States)

References

1996 singles
Kristine W songs
Songs written by Kristine W
Songs written by Rollo Armstrong
Songs written by Rob Dougan
1996 songs